Kenansville Historic District is a national historic district located at Kenansville, Duplin County, North Carolina. The district encompasses 18 contributing buildings in Kenansville. It includes predominantly residential buildings with notable examples of Greek Revival, Federal, and Italianate style architecture.  Notable buildings include the Brown-Jones House, Kelly-Farrier House, the Kenan House (Liberty Hall), the Pearsall House, the Graham House, the Isaac Kelly House, the Dr. David Gillespie House, the Grove Presbyterian Church, and the Kenansville Baptist Church.

It was added to the National Register of Historic Places in 1975.

References

Historic districts on the National Register of Historic Places in North Carolina
Greek Revival architecture in North Carolina
Italianate architecture in North Carolina
Federal architecture in North Carolina
Buildings and structures in Duplin County, North Carolina
National Register of Historic Places in Duplin County, North Carolina